Jawaharlal Nehru Pharma City or JN Pharma City or Pharma City is a Pharma SEZ situated in  the city of Visakhapatnam, India. It is the first industrial township in India.

Location

Details
This pharma city foundation stone was laid  by Y. S. Rajasekhara Reddy, then Chief Minister of Andhra Pradesh.  It is a pharma product SEZ and Andhra Pradesh State largest Pharma SEZ spread over 2143 acres. Most all multi-national pharma companies started their operations here, like Hospira, Hetero, Shasun, Natco, Eisai, Mylan, Biocon, GVK BIO, and Gland Pharma.

See also
 Visakhapatnam Special Economic Zone

References

Economy of Visakhapatnam
Special Economic Zones of India
Year of establishment missing